Alexandra Ivanovskaya (Russian: Александра Ивановская) was born in Komsomolsk-on-Amur, Soviet Union in 1989. She was crowned "Miss Russia 2005" in Moscow on 22 December. During the beauty pageant, she represented her city, Khabarovsk Alexandra defeated 50 contestants from around the country for the crown.

References

1989 births
Living people
People from Komsomolsk-on-Amur
Miss Russia winners
Russian female models